Tom Ryan (7 November 1924 – 24 February 2017) was a former Australian rules footballer who played with South Melbourne in the Victorian Football League (VFL).

Ryan was appointed coach of Stanhope for the 1953 season.

Notes

External links 		
		
		
		
		
		

1924 births
2017 deaths
Australian rules footballers from South Australia		
Sydney Swans players
South Adelaide Football Club players